The Palazzo Piccolomini, also known as the Palazzo Todeschini Piccolomini is a Renaissance-style palace in the city of Siena, region of Tuscany, Italy. It is located on the Banchi di Sotto, at the corner with Via Rinaldini; uphill and west of the church of San Martino, the Loggia del Papa, and the Palazzo delle Papesse, which also built by a Piccolomini family member.

History
The palace was erected by Giacomo and Andrea Piccolomini, nephews of Pope Pius II; the designs were requested  from Bernardo Rossellino. Construction proceeded between 1460 and 1495. The palace recalls the Palazzi Medici Riccardi and Ruccellai in Florence, with the rough ashlar block surface and mullioned windows. The sculptural additions were completed by Antonio Federighi and Urbano da Cortona.

The palace was bought and refurbished by the Bank of Italy in 1884. 

The Piano Nobile received some neo-Renaissance frescoes in the 19th century. The architect was Augusto Corbi. It now serves as a contemporary art gallery and museum. In the second floor, a terrace faces the roofs of the medieval town offering a great view of the Duomo, while on the highest point of the palace a rooftop loggia offers a view of the surrounding landscape.

There is also a Gothic-style Palazzo Piccolomini-Clementini across the street on Via di Banchi Sotto #75.

References

Piccolomini
Houses completed in the 15th century
Renaissance architecture in Siena
15th-century establishments in the Republic of Siena